Madchester was a musical and cultural scene that developed in the English city of Manchester in the late 1980s, closely associated with the indie dance scene. Indie-dance (sometimes referred to as indie-rave) saw artists merging indie music with elements of acid house, psychedelia and 1960s pop. The term Madchester was coined by Factory Records' Tony Wilson, with the label popularised by the British music press in the early 1990s, and its most famous groups include the Stone Roses, Happy Mondays, Inspiral Carpets, the Charlatans, James and 808 State. It is widely seen as being heavily influenced by drugs, especially MDMA. At that time, the Haçienda nightclub, co-owned by members of New Order, was a major catalyst for the distinctive musical ethos in the city that was called the Second Summer of Love.

Pre-Madchester
The music scene in Manchester immediately before the Madchester era had been dominated by The Smiths, New Order, and The Fall, who were to become a significant influence on the Madchester scene. The May 1982 opening of the Haçienda nightclub, an initiative of Factory Records, was also influential in the development of popular culture in Manchester. For the first few years of its life, the club played predominantly club-oriented pop music and hosted gigs by artists including New Order, Cabaret Voltaire, Culture Club, Thompson Twins, and the Smiths. It had DJs such as Hewan Clarke and Greg Wilson and switched focus from being a live venue to being a dance club by 1986. In 1987, the Hacienda started playing house music with DJs Mike Pickering, Graeme Park, and "Little" Martin Prendergast hosting "Nude Night" on Fridays.

The Festival of the Tenth Summer in July 1986, organised by Factory Records, helped to consolidate Manchester's standing as a centre for alternative pop culture. The festival included film screenings, a music seminar, art shows, and gigs by the city's most prominent bands, including an all-day gig at Manchester G-Mex featuring A Certain Ratio, the Smiths, New Order, and the Fall. According to Dave Haslam, the festival demonstrated that "the city had become synonymous with larger-than-life characters playing cutting edge music. [...] Individuals were inspired and the city was energised; of  own accord, uncontrolled".

The Haçienda went from making a consistent loss to selling out by early 1987. During 1987, it hosted performances by American house artists including Frankie Knuckles and Adonis. Other clubs in the Manchester area started to catch on to house music including Devilles, Isadora's, Konspiracy, House, Soundgardens and Man Alive in the city centre, Bugsy's in Ashton-under-Lyne and the Osbourne Club in Miles Platting. Another key factor in the build-up to Madchester was the sudden availability of the drug MDMA in the city, beginning in 1987 and growing the following year. According to Haslam, "[MDMA] use changed clubs forever; a night at the Haçienda went from being a great night out to an intense, life changing experience."

The British music scene was such that The Guardian later stated, "The '80s looked destined to end in musical ignominy." The Madchester movement burgeoned as its sound was new and refreshing, and its popularity soon grew. Music by artists such as the Stone Roses and Happy Mondays began to chart highly in 1989 with New Order releasing the acid house-influenced Technique, which topped the UK Albums Chart.

Beginnings
In October 1988, the Stone Roses released "Elephant Stone" as a single. Around the same time, the Happy Mondays released the single "Wrote for Luck" (followed by the Bummed album, produced by Martin Hannett). In November, A Guy Called Gerald released his first solo single, "Voodoo Ray". Only "Voodoo Ray" was a commercial success; by December of that year, however, a sense had started to develop in the British music press that there was something going on in the city. According to Sean O'Hagan, writing in the NME, "There is a particularly credible music biz rumour-come theory that certain Northern towns — Manchester being the prime example — have had their water supply treated with small doses of mind-expanding chemicals. [...] Everyone from Happy Mondays to the severely disorientated Morrissey conform to the theory in some way. Enter A Guy Called Gerald, out of his box on the limitless possibilities of a bank of keyboards."

The Stone Roses' following increased as they gigged around the country and released the "Made of Stone" single in February 1989. This did not chart, but enthusiasm for the band in the music press intensified when they released their debut album (produced by John Leckie) in March. Bob Stanley (later of Saint Etienne), reviewing the Stone Roses album in Melody Maker, wrote, "This is simply the best debut LP I've heard in my record buying lifetime. Forget everybody else. Forget work tomorrow." NME did not put it quite so strongly, but reported nonetheless that it was being talked of as "the greatest album ever made". John Robb in Sounds gave the album 9/10 and said that the Stone Roses "revolutionised British pop".

The club scene in Manchester continued to grow during 1988 and 1989, with the Haçienda launching Ibiza-themed nights in the summer of 1988 and the "Hot" acid house night (hosted by Mike Pickering and Jon DaSilva) in November of the same year.

"Baggy" 

The "baggy" sound generally includes a combination of funk, psychedelia, guitar rock, and house music. In the Manchester context, the music can be seen as mainly influenced by the indie music that had dominated the city's music scene during the 1980s, but also absorbing the various influences coming through "the Haçienda" nightclub. Alongside the music, a way of dressing emerged that gave baggy its name. Baggy jeans (often flared, with the pants usually being made by Shami Ahmed's 'Joe Bloggs' brand) alongside brightly coloured or tie-dye casual tops and general 1960s style became fashionable first in Manchester and then across the country, frequently topped off with a fishing hat in the style sported by the Stone Roses' drummer Alan "Reni" Wren. The overall look was part rave, part retro or part hippie, part football casual. Many Madchester bands had football casual fans and a number of bands even wore football shirts.

Growing success
In mid-1989, media interest in the Manchester scene continued to grow. In September, the Happy Mondays released a Vince Clarke remix of "Wrote for Luck" as a single. In November, four important singles were released: "Move" by the Inspiral Carpets, "Pacific State" by 808 State, the Happy Mondays EP Madchester Rave On and "Fools Gold"/"What the World is Waiting For" by the Stone Roses. The Happy Mondays record, featuring the lead track "Hallelujah!", coined the term "Madchester" – it had originally been suggested by their video directors the Bailey Brothers as a potential T-shirt slogan.

In November, the Stone Roses performed a gig at London's Alexandra Palace and were invited onto BBC Two's high-brow Late Show (during their performance the electricity was cut off by noise limiting circuitry and singer Ian Brown shouted "Amateurs, amateurs" as the presenter tried to link into the next item). On 23 November 1989, the Stone Roses and the Happy Mondays appeared on the same edition of Top of the Pops. The "Fools Gold" single made number 8 in the UK Singles Chart, becoming the biggest-selling indie single of the year.

Madchester became something of an industry bandwagon from this time. According to NME journalist Stuart Maconie, the British press had "gone bonkers over Manchester bands". James were amongst the first beneficiaries of this. The local success of their self-financed singles "Come Home" and "Sit Down" led to a deal with Fontana, and they were to score chart hits with "How Was it For You" and a re-recorded version of "Come Home" in the summer of 1990.

The Charlatans came to prominence through appearances in Manchester, particularly as a support act to the Stone Roses and became strongly associated with the scene. They released a debut single "Indian Rope" in October 1989 and their second "The Only One I Know" made the UK top ten. A number of other Manchester bands gained the attention of the music press during 1990, including World of Twist, New Fast Automatic Daffodils, the High, Northside, the Paris Angels, and Intastella. These "second wave" bands, according to John Robb, "copped the critical backlash, but were making great music". and they also received a great deal of local support with TV appearances on various Granada shows and local radio play.

Commercial success
Bands associated with the Madchester scene released material almost exclusively on indie records labels, with the significant exception of James, who signed to Fontana Records in 1989. The Madchester was growing in popularity and was not just a local trend in Manchester with an article entitled Stark Raving Madchester appearing in the Newsweek Magazine in 1990 describing the Madchester scene. The main Madchester bands dominated the UK Indie Charts during late 1989 and much of 1990.

The success in the UK Singles and Albums charts of a number of indie acts associated with a "scene" was unprecedented at the time. "Step On" and "Kinky Afro" by the Happy Mondays both made number 5 in the singles chart, whilst James scored the biggest Madchester hit, making number 2 in 1991 with a re-recording of "Sit Down". In the albums chart, the Happy Mondays made number 4 with Pills 'n' Thrills and Bellyaches, and the Inspiral Carpets got to number 2 with Life. The Charlatans were the only Madchester band to take the number 1 spot, with the album Some Friendly in the autumn of 1990.

Outside the UK, the success of Madchester was limited, although some releases gained recognition in specialist charts around the world. In the U.S., the albums The Stone Roses, Pills 'n' Thrills and Bellyaches and Some Friendly reached the lower echelons of the U.S. album chart. Several singles by the Stone Roses, the Inspiral Carpets, the Happy Mondays and the Charlatans were successful on the Billboard Modern Rock Tracks chart. The Happy Mondays toured the US in 1990 and charted on the Billboard Hot 100 with "Step On" reaching No. 57 in 1990. They also reached No. 1 on the Modern Rock Tracks chart, with "Kinky Afro" in 1990. The only other Madchester artist to reach No. 1 on the Modern Rock Tracks chart was the Charlatans, whose single "Weirdo" was No. 1 for the week of 23 May 1992.

Decline
On 27 May 1990, the Stone Roses performed at Spike Island in Widnes, supported by DJs Frankie Bones, Dave Haslam, Phonso Buller, and Dave Booth. The concert was described as a "Woodstock for the E generation". A rapid succession of chart hits followed during the summer, including "One Love" by the Stone Roses, "This Is How It Feels" by the Inspiral Carpets, "The Only One I Know" by the Charlatans, and "Kinky Afro" by the Happy Mondays. The end of the year saw triumphant concerts by James and a double-header with the Happy Mondays and 808 State, both at Manchester G-Mex.

The Stone Roses cancelled their June 1990 tour of America and issued a press statement saying, "America doesn't deserve us yet." However, their debut album sold more than 350,000 copies in the U.S. that year. The band also cancelled a gig in Spain and an appearance on the UK chat show Wogan. They did not face the public again until the end of 1994, spending the intervening time in and out of studios in Wales, where they recorded the album Second Coming, and fighting in court to release themselves from their contract with Silvertone Records.

The making of the next Happy Mondays album, Yes Please! was also problematic, and it would not be released until October 1992. The band flew to Barbados to record it, and went "crack crazy" according to Paul Ryder, making repeated requests to Factory Records for extra time and additional funds. This is reputed to have been the major factor in the bankruptcy of the label in November 1992.

With the two bands seen as the most central to the scene out of action, media fascination with Madchester dwindled. James, the Inspiral Carpets, the Charlatans, and 808 State continued to record with varying degrees of success during the 1990s, but ceased to be seen as part of a localised scene. Local bands catching the tail-end of Madchester, such as the Mock Turtles, became part of a wider baggy scene. The music press in the UK began to place more focus on shoegazing bands from southern England and the U.S. grunge scene, which in turn was overtaken by Britpop acts such as Manchester's Oasis and London's Blur.

Legacy

Musical legacy

The immediate influence of Madchester was an inspiration to the wider baggy movement in the UK, with bands from various parts of the country producing music in the early 1990s heavily influenced by the main Madchester players. These bands included Flowered Up (from London), the Farm and the Real People (from Liverpool), the Bridewell Taxis (from Leeds), the Soup Dragons (from Glasgow) and Ocean Colour Scene (from Birmingham). Blur, from Colchester, adopted a baggy style in their early career, although in an interview with Select Magazine in 1991 they claimed to have "killed" the genre. Blur famously shared a rivalry throughout the 1990s with fellow Britpop band Oasis, who hailed from Manchester.

Bands formed in Manchester during the Madchester era included the Chemical Brothers, The Verve, Sub Sub (who would later become Doves) and Oasis (Noel Gallagher had been a roadie for the Inspiral Carpets). More generally, the Madchester scene brought together electronic dance music and alternative rock, in particular the combination of the types of drumming found in funk and disco music (and sampled in '80s hip-hop music) with jingle-jangle guitar. In the 1990s, this became a commonplace formula, found frequently in even the most commercial music.

There have been numerous polls in the years following the Madchester movement to find the best song of the era. In 2005, "Voodoo Ray" by A Guy Called Gerald was voted as the best song from the Madchester scene. The song beat "Step On" by the Happy Mondays and "Waterfall" by the Stone Roses for first place.

In 2010, a new nightclub managed by Peter Hook of New Order, FAC251 opened in Manchester, with musical emphasis on Madchester music. Although Madchester faded by the mid-1990s, various bands have reformed for one-off concert tours. Notable bands which reformed in 2012 include the Stone Roses, the Happy Mondays and the Inspiral Carpets.

The Guardian critic Penny Anderson looked unfavourably upon the scene, calling it a "breeding ground for aggressively marketed mediocrity".

The sound of the scene influenced the electronic and dance influenced album by U2 Achtung Baby. Elysa Gardner of Rolling Stone compared the layering of dance beats into guitar-heavy mixes of the album to songs by British bands Happy Mondays and Jesus Jones. "Mysterious Ways" combines a funky guitar riff with a danceable, conga-laden beat, for what Bono called "U2 at our funkiest... Sly and The Family Stone meets Madchester baggy." It also influenced The Cure's song "Never Enough".

Impact on Manchester
The mushrooming of Manchester's nightlife during the Madchester period has had a long-term impact, particularly with the subsequent development of the Gay Village and Northern Quarter. City centre living is also something that began to catch on in Manchester in the wake of Madchester, and which continues to this day.

The attraction of the city was such that, at the height of Madchester in 1990, the University of Manchester was the most sought-after destination for university applicants in the UK.

The scene also gave a boost to the city's media and creative industries. Channel 4 already had great success with The Word and in its wake the BBC launched The 8:15 From Manchester, a Saturday morning kids' TV show (with a themetune by the Inspiral Carpets, a re-write of "Find out Why") and Granada Television also jumped on the bandwagon with a cheaper version of The Word, called 'Juice' presented by John Bramwell and Joan Collins' daughter Tara Newley.

Organised crime became an unfortunate side-story to Madchester, with the vibrancy of the clubbing scene in the city (and the popularity of illegal drugs, particularly ecstasy) providing a fertile environment for opportunist gangsterism. Violent incidents at the Haçienda led to a campaign against it by Greater Manchester Police, and contributed to its closure in 1997.

In the late 1990s, a Manchester musical walk of fame was commissioned for Oldham Street in the Northern Quarter of Manchester. The walk includes a triangular slab for each music group and pays homage to bands such as the Stone Roses, the Happy Mondays, the Inspiral Carpets, 808 State, and James. 

A blue plaque marks the site of The Boardwalk, another club seminal to the Madchester scene, where Oasis played their first gig and Dave Haslam hosted the Yellow club night until the club's closure in 1999. It reads "Madchester venue nightclub and rehearsal rooms" and features a yellow smiley face beneath. Funkademia, a club night that began at the Boardwalk in 1995, is now still held at Mint Lounge in the Northern Quarter.

See also
 Music of Manchester
 List of city nicknames in the United Kingdom
 The Haçienda
 Rave
 24 Hour Party People
 The Boardwalk

References

Further reading
 Christian Terry :  Brothers From Childhood To Oasis
 Crossley, James (April 2011): "For EveryManc a Religion: Biblical and Religious Language in the Manchester Music Scene, 1976–1994". Biblical Interpretation 19 (2): 151–180. DOI:10.1163/156851511X557343
 Luck, Richard: The Madchester Scene, Pocket Essentials, London, 2002
 Wilson, Tony: 24-hour Party People, Channel 4 Books, London, 2002
 McNichols, Conor (ed): NME Originals: Madchester, IPC, London, 2003

External links

Madchester on Pride of Manchester website
Madchester by Jonathan Schofield

 
Dance music genres
Music in Manchester
Music scenes
British styles of music
British rock music genres
1980s in music
1990s in music